Khalil "Tiki" Ghosn is a retired Lebanese-born American mixed martial artist, competing from 1998 to 2009 in the Welterweight division.

History
Tiki started his MMA career in high school when he discovered Muay Thai as a form of cross training for football, while attending Mater Dei High School in Santa Ana, California, where he played defensive back on the undefeated National Championship team in 1995. Ghosn then attended Orange Coast College for a brief time. Shortly thereafter, Tiki made the bold decision to pursue mixed martial arts and leave football behind.

Tiki is an experienced MMA fighter, being a veteran of the Ultimate Fighting Championship, Strikeforce, World Fighting Alliance, King of the Cage and World Extreme Cagefighting. Tiki is one of the three original members of Team Punishment, which included Tito Ortiz and Rob McCullough. He is also a training/sparring partner of Quinton "Rampage" Jackson, a former UFC Light Heavyweight Champion. Tiki was a featured coach on Spike TV's The Ultimate Fighter: Heavyweights as well as The Ultimate Fighter: Team Bisping vs. Team Miller.

Tiki was one of the four original MMA fighters managed by UFC President Dana White, prior to Dana becoming owner and president of the UFC. Dana and Tiki remain longtime friends. Tiki has been fighting and training mixed martial arts for 16 years. He is the founder and CEO of The Huntington Beach Ultimate Training Center. HBUTC was California's first real mixed martial arts training center. HBUTC opened on January 1, 2001 and is still thriving today. Tiki has received accolades for his fitness and training techniques and has featured training videos on TapoutVTC.com. Tiki has also trained, sparred, coached and cornered the likes of Michael Bisping, BJ Penn, Rob McCullough, Quinton Jackson, Tito Ortiz, Jason Miller, Ricco Rodriguez, Cheick Kongo, Joey Beltran, and Brandon Halsey.

Mixed martial arts record

|-
| Win
| align=center| 10–8
| Brian Warren
| Decision (unanimous)
| Call to Arms I
| 
| align=center| 3
| align=center| 5:00
| Ontario, California, United States
| 
|-
| Win
| align=center| 9–8
| Luke Stewart
| Decision (unanimous)
| Strikeforce: Shamrock vs. Le
| 
| align=center| 3
| align=center| 5:00
| San Jose, California, United States
| 
|-
| Loss
| align=center| 8–8
| Blas Avena
| Submission (rear-naked choke)
| WEC 29
| 
| align=center| 1
| align=center| 1:01
| Las Vegas, Nevada, United States
| 
|-
| Loss
| align=center| 8–7
| Dave Terrel
| TKO (Punches)
| WEC 26: Condit vs. Alessio
| 
| align=center| 2
| align=center| 1:46
| Las Vegas, Nevada, United States
| 
|-
| Loss
| align=center| 8–6
| Pat Healy
| TKO (shoulder injury)
| WEC 19: Undisputed
| 
| align=center| 3
| align=center| 0:25
| Lemoore, California, United States
| 
|-
| Loss
| align=center| 8–5
| Chris Lytle
| Submission (bulldog choke)
| UFC 47
| 
| align=center| 2
| align=center| 1:55
| Las Vegas, Nevada, United States
| 
|-
| Win
| align=center| 8–4
| Nick Gilardi
| Submission (guillotine choke)
| WEC 9: Cold Blooded
| 
| align=center| 1
| align=center| 4:52
| Lemoore, California, United States
| 
|-
| Win
| align=center| 7–4
| Ronald Jhun
| Decision (split)
| SuperBrawl 31
| 
| align=center| 3
| align=center| 5:00
| Honolulu, Hawaii, United States
| 
|-
| Loss
| align=center| 6–4
| Robbie Lawler
| KO (Punches)
| UFC 40
| 
| align=center| 1
| align=center| 1:29
| Las Vegas, Nevada, United States
| 
|-
| Win
| align=center| 6–3
| Kit Cope
| TKO (forfeit)
| WFA 2: Level 2
| 
| align=center| 2
| align=center| 5:00
| Las Vegas, Nevada, United States
| 
|-
| Win
| align=center| 5–3
| Steve Schelburn
| TKO (knees and punches)
| HFP 1: Rumble on the Reservation
| 
| align=center| 1
| align=center| 2:35
| Anza, California, United States
| 
|-
| Win
| align=center| 4–3
| Paul Rodriguez
| Decision (unanimous)
| World Fighting Alliance 1
| 
| align=center| 3
| align=center| 5:00
| Las Vegas, Nevada, United States
| 
|-
| Loss
| align=center| 3–3
| Sean Sherk
| TKO (shoulder injury)
| UFC 30
| 
| align=center| 2
| align=center| 4:47
| Atlantic City, New Jersey, United States
| 
|-
| Loss
| align=center| 3–2
| Bob Cook
| Submission (rear-naked choke)
| UFC 24
| 
| align=center| 2
| align=center| 1:29
| Lake Charles, Louisiana, United States
| 
|-
| Win
| align=center| 3–1
| Jason Maxwell
| Decision (split)
| KOTC 2 - Desert Storm
| 
| align=center| 2
| align=center| 5:00
| San Jacinto, California, United States
| 
|-
| Win
| align=center| 2–1
| Phil Ensminger
| Decision
| West Coast NHB Championships 3
| 
| align=center| 2
| align=center| 5:00
| Los Angeles, California, United States
| 
|-
| Win
| align=center| 1–1
| Doug Evans
| Submission (guillotine choke)
| West Coast NHB Championships 2
| 
| align=center| 1
| align=center| 1:02
| Compton, California, United States
| 
|-
| Loss
| align=center| 0–1
| Genki Sudo
| Decision (unanimous)
| Extreme Shoot 2
| 
| align=center| 3
| align=center| 5:00
| Mission Viejo, California, United States
|

References

External links

1977 births
Living people
American people of Lebanese descent
Sportspeople from Huntington Beach, California
American male mixed martial artists
Mixed martial artists from California
Welterweight mixed martial artists
Mixed martial artists utilizing Muay Thai
Ultimate Fighting Championship male fighters
American Muay Thai practitioners